Villemer is the name of two communes in France:

 Villemer, in the Seine-et-Marne département
 Villemer, in the Yonne département